Big Book may refer to:

 Big Book (award), a Russian literary award for best prose in Russian
 Big Book (thought experiment), involving ethics developed by Ludwig Wittgenstein
 The Big Book (Alcoholics Anonymous)
 The Big Book Of, a series of graphic novel anthologies published by the DC Comics imprint Paradox Press.
 The Big Read, a 2003 survey carried out by the BBC, with the goal of finding the "Nation's Best-loved Book" by way of a viewer vote via the Web, SMS and telephone